In enzymology, a 4-hydroxybenzoyl-CoA reductase is an enzyme found in some bacteria and archaea that catalyzes the chemical reaction

benzoyl-CoA + acceptor + H2O  4-hydroxybenzoyl-CoA + reduced acceptor

The 3 substrates of this enzyme are benzoyl-CoA, acceptor, and H2O, whereas its two products are 4-hydroxybenzoyl-CoA and reduced acceptor.

This enzyme participates in benzoate degradation via coa ligation.

Nomenclature 

This enzyme belongs to the family of oxidoreductases, specifically those acting on the CH-CH group of donor with other acceptors.  The systematic name of this enzyme class is benzoyl-CoA:acceptor oxidoreductase. Other names in common use include:
 4-hydroxybenzoyl-CoA reductase (dehydroxylating), and 
 4-hydroxybenzoyl-CoA:(acceptor) oxidoreductase.

References

Further reading 

 
 
 

EC 1.3.7
Enzymes of known structure